Sinemorets Hill (Halm Sinemorets \'h&lm si-ne-'mo-rets\) is the second most prominent (after Hesperides Hill) in the chain of hills surmounting Bulgarian Beach in eastern Livingston Island in the South Shetland Islands, Antarctica.

Sinemorets Hill is 380 m long in east-west direction and 230 m wide, with twin heights, the west-southwestern one being 64 m and the east-northeastern one 62 m, sheltering a small pool between them. It is snow free in the summer months and overlooks the Bulgarian base to the southwest. Relics of an old encampment were still discernible at its eastern slope in 1996.

Sinemorets is the name of a village and a cape on the Black Sea coast. The hill was named by the United Kingdom Antarctic Place-Names Committee (UK-APC) in 1994 at the request of the Second Bulgarian Antarctic Expedition (1993/94).

Location
Mapped in detail by the Spanish Servicio Geográfico del Ejército in 1991, Bulgarian mapping in 1996, 2005 and 2009. Co-ordinates, elevation and distances given according to a 1995-96 Bulgarian topographic survey.

Maps
 Isla Livingston: Península Hurd. Mapa topográfico de escala 1:25000. Madrid: Servicio Geográfico del Ejército, 1991. (Map reproduced on p. 16 of the linked work)
 L.L. Ivanov. Livingston Island: Central-Eastern Region. Scale 1:25000 topographic map.  Sofia: Antarctic Place-names Commission of Bulgaria, 1996.
 L.L. Ivanov et al. Antarctica: Livingston Island and Greenwich Island, South Shetland Islands. Scale 1:100000 topographic map. Sofia: Antarctic Place-names Commission of Bulgaria, 2005.
 L.L. Ivanov. Antarctica: Livingston Island and Greenwich, Robert, Snow and Smith Islands. Scale 1:120000 topographic map.  Troyan: Manfred Wörner Foundation, 2009.  
 Antarctica, South Shetland Islands, Livingston Island: Bulgarian Antarctic Base. Sheets 1 and 2. Scale 1:2000 topographic map. Geodesy, Cartography and Cadastre Agency, 2016. (in Bulgarian)
 L.L. Ivanov. Antarctica: Livingston Island and Smith Island. Scale 1:100000 topographic map. Manfred Wörner Foundation, 2017.

References
 Sinemorets Hill. SCAR Composite Antarctic Gazetteer.
 Bulgarian Antarctic Gazetteer. Antarctic Place-names Commission. (details in Bulgarian, basic data in English)

External links
 Sinemorets Hill. Copernix satellite image

Hills of Livingston Island